Motor racing was contested at the 1900 Summer Olympics. Fourteen events were held in conjunction with the 1900 World's Fair. These events have generally not been classified as official, although the IOC has never decided which events were "Olympic" and which were not.

Entries were by manufacturers rather than drivers and competitors' names were not adequately reported at the time. The exceptions are the two classes of the Paris-Toulouse-Paris race, one class of which was won by Louis Renault. Most events had only French competitors but there were some international entries.

Medal summary

References

External links
 GB Athletics – Olympic Games Medallists – Other Sports – Demonstration & Unofficial Sports
 LA84 report

1900 Summer Olympics events
Motor racing competitions
Discontinued sports at the Summer Olympics
1900 in motorsport